Teóphilo Bettencourt Pereira (11 April 1900 – 10 April 1988), known as just Teóphilo, was a Brazilian football player. He has played for Brazil national football team at the 1930 FIFA World Cup finals.

He played club football for Americano, São Cristóvão and Fluminense, winning the Campeonato Carioca in 1917 with Fluminense and in 1926 with São Cristóvão.

Honours

Club
 Campeonato Carioca (2): 
Fluminense: 1917
São Cristóvão: 1926

National
 Copa Río Branco (1): 
Brazil: 1931

References

1900 births
1988 deaths
Footballers from Rio de Janeiro (city)
Brazilian footballers
Brazil international footballers
1930 FIFA World Cup players
Fluminense FC players
Association football forwards